The men's 50 metre team pistol was a shooting sports event held as part of the Shooting at the 1920 Summer Olympics programme. It was the fourth and last appearance of the event. The competition was held on 2 August 1920. 65 shooters from 13 nations competed. The event was won by the United States, the nation's third consecutive victory in the event. Alfred Lane returned from the 1912 team, making him the second (and last) person to earn multiple medals, and multiple gold medals, in the men's team pistol. Sweden also repeated as silver medalists. Bronze went to Brazil, in that nation's debut in the event.

About a quarter of the way through the competition, it was discovered that two of the teams were shooting from the wrong distances. Brazil was shooting from 45 metres, while the United States was at 54 metres. Both teams restarted; the United States was given the option of keeping the scores from the longer distance, but declined. The American scores for the reshoot were actually lower, likely a result of increased wind, but the United States still won comfortably.

Background

This was the fourth and final appearance of a team version of what would become (for individuals) standardised as the men's ISSF 50 meter pistol event. The team event was held 4 times, at every Summer Olympics from 1900 to 1920 (except 1904, when no shooting events were held).

Brazil, Czechoslovakia, Denmark, Finland, Italy, and Spain each made their debut in the event. Belgium, France, Greece, the Netherlands, Sweden, and the United States all made their third appearance; no nation had appeared all four times the event was held.

Competition format

The competition had each shooter fire 60 shots, in 10 series of 6 shots each, at a distance of 50 metres. The target was round, 50 centimetres in diameter, with 10 scoring rings. Scoring for each shot was up to 10 points, in increments of 1 point. The maximum individual score possible was 600 points. The team score was the sum of the five shooters' individual scores, with a maximum of 3000 points. Shooters who had competed in the team event could use their team score in the individual competition.

Pistols with hairspring triggers, allowed in the world championship, continued to be banned.

Schedule

Results

The scores of the five shooters on each team were summed to give a team score. The maximum score was 3000.

References

External links
 Official Report
 

Shooting at the 1920 Summer Olympics